Bujumbura City Football Club is a Burundian professional football club based in Bujumbura, that competes in the Burundi Ligue A, the top tier of Burundi football. 

The club was founded in 2011 as Guêpiers du Lac and was renamed in 2014 as Bujumbura City FC.

Stadium
Currently the team plays at the 22,000 capacity Intwari Stadium in Bujumbura.

League participations
Burundi Premier League: 2013–
Burundi Second Division: ????–2013

References

External links
Soccerway

Football clubs in Burundi